Paremhat 20 - Coptic Calendar - Paremhat 22

The twenty-first day of the Coptic month of Paremhat, the seventh month of the Coptic year. In common years, this day corresponds to March 17, of the Julian Calendar, and March 30, of the Gregorian Calendar. This day falls in the Coptic Season of Shemu, the season of the Harvest.

Commemorations

Feasts 

 Monthly commemoration of the Virgin Saint Mary, the Theotokos

Martyrs 

 The martyrdom of Saints Theodore and Timothy

Other commemorations 

 The visit of the Savior to Bethany 
 The Conspiracy of the Chief-priests to kill Saint Lazarus

References 

Days of the Coptic calendar